Orel Township is located in Wayne County, Illinois. As of the 2010 census, its population was 1,420 and it contained 678 housing units.

Geography

Demographics

References

External links
City-data.com
Illinois State Archives

Townships in Wayne County, Illinois
Townships in Illinois